Friedrich Glauser (4 February 1896 in Vienna – 8 December 1938 in Nervi) was a German-language Swiss writer. He was a morphine and opium addict for most of his life. In his first novel Gourrama, written between 1928 and 1930, he treated his own experiences at the French Foreign Legion. The evening before his wedding day, he suffered a stroke caused by cerebral infarction, and died two days later. Friedrich Glauser's literary estate is archived in the Swiss Literary Archives in Bern.

Since 1987, the annual  has been one of the best-known German-language crime writing awards.

Stories
The Sergeant Studer detective novels are set in the Switzerland and Europe of the 1930s, and make frequent reference to current European history, such as the Weimar Republic hyperinflation and the banking scams and scandals that marked that period. Today's readers may be surprised that no attention is given to a prominent politician of that era, Adolf Hitler.

The novels were written in standard German with a sprinkling of Swiss dialect terms. The translations by Bitter Lemon Press make note of shifts in language register.

Jakob Studer is a sergeant in the constabulary of the Canton of Bern. He is old for his rank, having had to start over again in a new police force after being fired from his original force. The firing is mentioned in each novel as being politically motivated, because Studer refused to back off from a full investigation of a banking scandal in which he eventually caught the real criminals, well-connected top people in the banking industry, rather than making do with a few minor players. Other minor characters, notably his cheerful wife and a local attorney with whom Studer plays billiards, play small roles within the books, sometimes helping to solve the mysteries.

The Spoke opens at the wedding between Sgt. Jakob Studer's daughter and a young police constable, held at a small hotel run by an old schoolmate of Studer. Before the evening is over, another hotel guest (not a member of the wedding party) has been murdered. The unusual weapon chosen, a sharpened bicycle spoke, leads Studer and the local police to suspect the town's bicycle repairman, a gentle but mentally slow man who was severely abused during childhood.

Fever is set roughly a year after The Spoke. Sgt. Studer's daughter has just given birth to a baby boy, and Studer, on assignment in Paris, receives the news from his wife, who has gone to help the young couple with their first child. Studer goes out for celebratory drinks with several of the French gendarmerie with whom he has been working. At the pub, a rather strange White Father joins the group and tells a story of a "clairvoyant corporal" in a French Foreign Legion battalion to which the priest has been assigned who has "predicted" the murder of two Swiss women. Upon his return to Switzerland, Studer learns of the two women's deaths and begins an investigation that will take him back through France to Algeria to find the killer.

The Chinaman does not contain any clues as to where it fits within the timeline of the other stories. On 18 July (year unspecified), Studer meets an elderly retiree who has returned to the small village where he was born, near Bern, after decades spent working in various parts of Asia. The retiree tells Studer that he is sure he will be murdered very soon. Four months later, on 18 November, the retiree's prediction comes true, shortly after a seemingly unrelated, apparently natural death. After a cooperating witness is murdered, Studer must race to find the murderer before more people are killed.

Bibliography
Wachtmeister Studer, Zürich 1936; English translation: Thumbprint, 2004
Matto regiert, Zürich 1936; English translation: In Matto's Realm, 2005
Die Fieberkurve, Zürich 1938; English translation: Fever, 2006
Der Chinese, Zürich 1939; English translation: The Chinaman, 2007
Gourrama, Zürich 1940
Der Tee der drei alten Damen, Zürich 1940
Krock & Co. (aka Die Speiche), Zürich 1941; English translation: The Spoke, 2008
Beichte in der Nacht, Zürich 1945
Dada, Ascona und andere Erinnerungen, Zürich 1976
Morphium und autobiographische Texte, Zürich 1980
Briefe (2 volumes, ed. Bernhard Echte), Zürich 1988/91
Das erzählerische Werk (4 volumes, ed. Bernhard Echte), Zürich 1992–93

Further reading
 Karolle, K. Julia.  Book review: Die Leiche in der Bibliothek. Friedrich Glauser und der Detektiv-Roman, by Patrick Bühler.  Monatshefte (Madison, WI), vol. 96, no. 2 (July 2004), pp. 309-311.

 Karolle, K. Julia. The Role of Language in the Construction of Identity and the Swiss Crime Novel in Friedrich Glauser's «Gourrama», «Der Tee der drei alten Damen» and «Schlumpf Erwin Mord». Ph.D. dissertation, University of Wisconsin-Madison, 2001.

 Karolle-Berg, Julia.  "Fahnderwachtmeister Jakob Studer." One Hundred Greatest Literary Detectives, edited by Eric Sandberg. Lanham, Maryland: Rowman & Littlefield, 2018, pp. 174-176.

Filmography
Constable Studer, 1939
, 1943
Madness Rules, 1947

External links
Literary estate of Friedrich Glauser in the archive database HelveticArchives of the Swiss National Library
Publications by and about Friedrich Glauser in the catalogue Helveticat of the Swiss National Library

1896 births
1938 deaths
Swiss male novelists
Soldiers of the French Foreign Legion
20th-century Swiss novelists
20th-century male writers